Adam Best (born 16 November 1982 in Donaghadee, County Down, Northern Ireland) is an actor from Northern Ireland who trained at the Royal Welsh College of Music and Drama for 3 years. He attended Donaghadee Primary School and Bangor Grammar School and gained experience with the Ulster Youth Theatre and Drama School.

Best played Matt Parker on the BBC One drama Holby City. He has also appeared in episodes of Silent Witness, The Bill and Waking the Dead as well as The Catherine Tate Show 2007 Christmas Special. In 2011, Best took part in an advertisement for Meteor.

Filmography

 Silent Witness (2004) as Young David Kelman
 Star Spell (2005) as himself
 Holby City (2005–2007) as Matt Parker
 The Catherine Tate Show Christmas Special (2007) as himself
 The Bill - (2009) as Conor Deegan
 Waking the Dead (2009) as Fr Quinn
 Cup Cake (2010) as PJ Johnson
 Blooded (2011) as Ben Fitzpatrick
 Meteor Advertisement (2011) as himself

Radio

 John Walkers Blues

Stage

 The Caucasian Chalk Circle (1998) as Old Man
 The Wizard of Oz (2000) as Wizard
 Blackout (2003) as Danny.
  The Woman In Black (2012) As The Actor
 Public Enemy (2013) as Horster
 The Beauty Queen of Leenane as Pato; Lyric Theatre (Hammersmith), London (2021)

External links
Holby.tv fan website
Holby City website

Holby.tv series 8 interview and profile

Male television actors from Northern Ireland
1983 births
Living people
Alumni of the Royal Welsh College of Music & Drama
People from Donaghadee
People educated at Bangor Grammar School
Male stage actors from Northern Ireland